Magdalena Ansue (born 21 April 1974) is an Equatoguinean sprinter. She competed in the women's 100 metres at the 1992 Summer Olympics.

References

External links
 

1974 births
Living people
Athletes (track and field) at the 1992 Summer Olympics
Equatoguinean female sprinters
Olympic athletes of Equatorial Guinea
Place of birth missing (living people)
Olympic female sprinters